In high-energy physics, B − L (pronounced "bee minus ell") is the difference between the baryon number (B) and the lepton number (L).

Details
This quantum number is the charge of a global/gauge U(1) symmetry in some Grand Unified Theory models, called U(1)B−L. Unlike baryon number alone or lepton number alone, this hypothetical symmetry would not be broken by chiral anomalies or gravitational anomalies, as long as this symmetry is global, which is why this symmetry is often invoked.

If  exists as a symmetry, then for the seesaw mechanism to work  has to be spontaneously broken to give the neutrinos a nonzero mass.

The anomalies that would break baryon number conservation and lepton number conservation individually cancel in such a way that  is always conserved. One hypothetical example is proton decay where a proton would decay into a pion and positron.

The weak hypercharge  is related to  via

where  charge (not to be confused with the X boson) is the conserved quantum number associated with the global U(1) symmetry Grand Unified Theory.

See also
Baryogenesis
Leptogenesis
Majoron
Proton decay
X and Y bosons
X (charge)
Leptoquark

References

Conservation laws
Flavour (particle physics)